Flint station may refer to:
 Flint (Amtrak station), Flint, Michigan, United States
 Flint railway station, Flint, Wales, United Kingdom